Behind Closed Doors is a 2014 Moroccan drama film directed by Mohamed Bensouda and co-produced by him with Christophe Kay Kourdouly. The film stars Zineb Obeid with Karim Doukkali, Ahmed Saguia, and Amal Ayouch in supporting roles. The film is about Samira, a young married woman who is harassed by the new director of the office.

The film was shot in Casablanca, Morocco. The film received critics acclaim and screened worldwide.

Cast
 Zineb Obeid as Samira
 Karim Doukkali as Mourad
 Ahmed Saguia as Mouhsine
 Amal Ayouch as The lawyer

References

External links 
 

Moroccan drama films
2014 films
2014 drama films